Tufeștii may refer to one of two places in Romania:

 Tufeștii de Jos, a village in Rebricea Commune, Vaslui County
 Tufeștii de Sus, a village in Scânteia Commune, Iași County